Goodreads is an American social cataloging website and a subsidiary of Amazon that allows individuals to search its database of books, annotations, quotes, and reviews. Users can sign up and register books to generate library catalogs and reading lists. They can also create their own groups of book suggestions, surveys, polls, blogs, and discussions. The website's offices are located in San Francisco.

Goodreads was founded in December 2006 and launched in January 2007 by Otis Chandler and Elizabeth Khuri Chandler. In December 2007, the site had 650,000 members and 10,000,000 books had been added. By July 2012, the site reported 10 million members, 20 million monthly visits, and thirty employees. On March 28, 2013, Amazon announced its acquisition of Goodreads, and by July 23, 2013, Goodreads announced their user base had grown to 20 million members.

By July 2019, the site had 90 million members.

History

Founders 

Goodreads founders Otis Chandler and Elizabeth Khuri Chandler first met while studying at Stanford (Engineering and English respectively). After university Chandler initially worked as a programmer in on-line businesses, including dating sites, and Khuri Chandler as a journalist. Chandler and Khuri both grew up in California. Chandler is a descendant of the publisher of the Los Angeles Times; Otis Chandler.

Foundation and mission
Goodreads was founded in 2006. The idea came about when Otis Chandler was browsing through his friend's bookshelf. He wanted to integrate this scanning experience and to create a space where people could write reviews regarding the books that they read.

Goodreads addressed what publishers call the "discoverability problem" by guiding consumers in the digital age to find books they might want to read.

Early years
Before gaining much traction, Otis and Elizabeth Chandler grew the platform through their friends of friends where it reached 800 users. Eventually, it gained attention through the media such as Mashable and other various blogs. During its first year of business, the company was run without any formal funding. In December 2007, the site received funding estimated at $750,000 from angel investors. This funding lasted Goodreads until 2009, when Goodreads received two million dollars from True Ventures.

In October 2010, the company opened its application programming interface, which enabled developers to access its ratings and titles.

In 2011, Goodreads acquired Discovereads, a book recommendation engine that employs "machine learning algorithms to analyze which books people might like, based on books they've liked in the past and books that people with similar tastes have liked." After a user has rated 20 books on its five-star scale, the site will begin making recommendations. Otis Chandler believed this rating system would be superior to Amazon's, as Amazon's includes books a user has browsed or purchased as gifts when determining its recommendations. Later that year, Goodreads introduced an algorithm to suggest books to registered users and had over five million members. The New Yorkers Macy Halford noted that the algorithm was not perfect, as the number of books needed to create a perfect recommendation system is so large that "by the time I'd got halfway there, my reading preferences would have changed and I'd have to start over again."

As of 2012, membership was required to use but free. In October 2012, Goodreads announced it had grown to 11 million members with 395 million books cataloged and over 20,000 book clubs created by its users. A month later, in November 2012, Goodreads had surpassed 12 million members, with the member base having doubled in one year.

2013 acquisition by Amazon
In March 2013, Amazon made an agreement to acquire Goodreads in the second quarter of 2013 for an undisclosed sum. Amazon had previously purchased the competitor Shelfari in 2008, with the Goodreads purchase "stunning" the book industry. The Authors Guild called it a "truly devastating act of vertical integration" and that Amazon's "control of online bookselling approaches the insurmountable." There were mixed reactions from Goodreads users, at the time totaling 16 million members. Goodreads founder Otis Chandler said that "his management team would remain in place to guard the reviewing process" with the acquisition. Chandler continued running Goodreads until 2019. The New York Times noted that Goodreads, at the time of the acquisition, had a more reputable reviewing system than Amazon's.

Noting that some authors had been "too aggressive in their self-promotion" (as Goodreads admitted in an email) and that some readers had responded with aggression, in September 2013, Goodreads announced it would delete, without warning, reviews that threatened authors or mentioned authors' behavior. As of April 2020, the site's guidelines still state that "reviews that are predominantly about an author's behavior and not about the book will be deleted."

2014–2019
In January 2016, Amazon announced that it would shut down Shelfari in favor of Goodreads, effective March 16, 2016. Users were offered the ability to export data and migrate accounts. In April 2016, Goodreads announced that over 50 million user reviews had been posted to the website.

Features

Book discovery 
On the Goodreads website, users can add books to their personal bookshelves, rate and review books, see what their friends and authors are reading, participate in discussion boards and groups on a variety of topics, and get suggestions for future reading choices based on their reviews of previously read books. Once users have added friends to their profile, they will see their friends' shelves and reviews and can comment on friends' pages. Goodreads features a rating system of one to five stars, with the option of accompanying the rating with a written review. The site provides default bookshelves—read, currently-reading, to-read—and the opportunity to create customized shelves to categorize a user's books.

Content access 
Goodreads users can read or listen to a preview of a book on the website using Kindle Cloud Reader and Audible. Goodreads also offers quizzes and trivia, quotations, book lists, and free giveaways. Members can receive the regular newsletter featuring new books, suggestions, author interviews, and poetry. If a user has written a work, the work can be linked on the author's profile page, which also includes an author's blog. Goodreads organizes offline opportunities as well, such as in-person book exchanges and "literary pub crawls".

User interaction 
The website facilitates reader interactions with authors through the interviews, giveaways, authors' blogs, and profile information. There is also a special section for authors with suggestions for promoting their works on Goodreads.com, aimed at helping them reach their target audience. By 2011, "seventeen thousand authors, including James Patterson and Margaret Atwood" used Goodreads to advertise. 

Users can add each other as "Friends", enabling them to share reviews, posts, book recommendations, and messages.

Goodreads has a presence on Facebook, Pinterest, Twitter, and other social networking sites. Linking a Goodreads account with a social networking account like Facebook enables the ability to import contacts from the social networking account to Goodreads, expanding one's Goodreads "Friends" list. There are settings available, as well, to allow Goodreads to post straight to a social networking account, which informs, e.g., Facebook friends, what one is reading or how one rated a book.

The Amazon Kindle Paperwhite (version 2) and Kindle Voyage feature integration with Goodreads' social network via a user interface button.

Catalog data 
Book catalog data was seeded with large imports from various closed and open data sources, including individual publishers, Ingram, Amazon (before 2012 and after 2013), WorldCat and the Library of Congress.

Goodreads librarians improve book information on the website, including editing book and author information and adding cover images. Goodreads members can apply to become volunteer librarians after they have 50 books on their profile. Goodreads librarians coordinate on the Goodreads Librarian Group.

User data becomes proprietary to Goodreads though available via an application programming interface, or API, unlike similar projects like The Open Library which publish the catalog and user edits as open data. In December 2020, Goodreads deactivated API keys more than 30 days old and said it would no longer be issuing new API keys.

Metadata source change 
In January 2012, Goodreads switched from using Amazon's public Product Advertising API for book metadata (such as title, author, and number of pages) to book wholesaler Ingram. Goodreads felt Amazon's requirements for using its API were too restrictive, and the combination of Ingram, the Library of Congress, and other sources would be more flexible. Some users worried that their reading records would be lost, but Goodreads had a number of plans in place to ease the transition and ensure that no data was lost, even for titles that might be in danger of deletion because they were available only through Amazon, such as Kindle editions and self-published works on Amazon. 

In May 2013, as a result of Goodreads' acquisition by Amazon, Goodreads began using Amazon's data again.

Competition and review fairness 
In 2012, after a receiving a poor review on her novel The Selection, author Kiera Cass encouraged her Twitter followers to "knock [the review] off" the front page of Goodreads' section on the book. This sparked public outrage and started a discussion on the relationship between authors and reviewers on Goodreads.  That same year, Goodreads received criticism from users about the availability and tone of reviews posted on the site, with some users and websites stating that certain reviewers were harassing and encouraging attacks on authors. Goodreads publicly posted its review guidelines in August 2012 to address these issues. After Amazon's acquisition of Goodreads, this policy was modified to include deletion of any review containing "an ad hominem attack or an off-topic comment". Several news sources reported the announcement, noting Amazon's business reasons for the move:

Regarding the 2013 Amazon acquisition of Goodreads, The New York Times said that: "Goodreads was a rival to Amazon as a place for discovering books" and that this deal "consolidates Amazon's power to determine which authors get exposure for their work".

Goodreads Choice Awards

Criticism
Critics of the Goodreads platform feel that Goodreads' dominant position, coupled with limited development by Amazon, has prevented better tools emerging for personalized book recommendations. Goodreads has also fallen under criticism from users who feel that the site is outdated and prone to frequent crashes and bugs, and that the recommendations are poor, frequently suggesting popular books at random rather than anything more personalized.

Authors who are aware of the site have noted problematic qualities of Goodreads affecting discoverability and search engine results, particularly the platform's inability to sort pseudonyms, and its refusal to allow authors to choose the primary author name that appears on book records. According to Goodreads, transgender authors who published under a different name before coming out can contact the website directly to request exceptions, although there are no known or notable cases where trans authors have been given such choices. 
Some authors have criticized Goodreads's stance on functioning like a public library rather than giving authors any control over how their information is displayed, noting that for most authors, Goodreads is the first page people see when they search on a web browser. It has also been criticized that Goodreads allows both users and authors to post quotes attributed to an author without verification of any sort; removal of such quotes is left largely in the hands of volunteer "librarians", as authors have little to no individual control over quotes posted to their own profiles. Having false or invalid quotes removed can be a difficult process; problematically the quotes can be picked up by third-party websites like Pinterest and Instagram in the meantime, spreading invalid quotes attributed to the author even further, as Goodreads quotes bring a high amount of web traffic. Goodreads often refuses to remove quotes with "likes" from an author's profile, even if the quotes are false or invalid.

Both authors and readers have noted an increase in political banter, trolling, cancel culture and cyberbullying afflicting the website. Goodreads has tried to address this, implementing rules such as only allowing reviewers to criticize a book itself, not author behaviour or political affiliations. Critics of Goodreads have considered this decision to be a form of censorship. A form of extortion scam known as "review bombing", in which trolls post numerous 1-star ratings and poor reviews on an author's new book from different sock-puppet accounts to make the book look bad (sometimes demanding money or that the author quit Goodreads usage to stop the bad reviews from coming in), has also been widely reported as a growing form of bullying on Goodreads, targeting both traditional and self-published authors. Popular fantasy novelist Rin Chupeco has noted that authors from marginalized groups are often a target, and she also criticized the minimalist approach Goodreads takes to moderation, saying, "Goodreads only removes reviews that specifically target the author, but they do not do that for every book, either—just for the authors with big enough marketing and publicity teams to demand these removals." Other victims of review bombing have pointed out that once a record for a book is created on Goodreads, even if the book has never been released to the public, is not in fact a "book" by Goodreads's definition, or will never be released to the public due to errors or delays in publishing, one-star ratings can still appear from accounts with no access to the title. Because Goodreads allows reviews for any book record as soon as it first appears on Goodreads, and cannot verify that any account-holder in fact owns the book they claim to have read, there is no clear way to police this. Some authors have suggested that Goodreads take a stricter approach to public review postings in the same manner that Amazon has done in the past, such as requiring a telephone number, a verified account by email address, and a real name before any account-holder can post public ratings or reviews.

Removal from site
In early 2021, Amazon removed all new and used copies of William Luther Pierce's white supremacist novel The Turner Diaries from sales on its platform and subsidiary platforms, citing concerns with the QAnon movement as the cause. As a result, Goodreads, an Amazon company, stripped the metadata from its record for the offending title, segregating The Turner Diaries to its "NOT A BOOK" author moniker (a category typically used to weed non-book items and plagiarized titles from the platform).

See also 
 aNobii
 Babelio
 BookArmy
 Bookish
 douban
 iDreamBooks
 LibraryThing
 Open Library
 Readgeek
 Shelfari
 The StoryGraph
 Library 2.0 the concept behind Goodreads and similar sites

References

Bibliography
 
 
  (archived)

External links 

 

Amazon (company) acquisitions
American review websites
Book review websites
Companies based in San Francisco
Internet properties established in 2006
Library 2.0
Social cataloging applications